Breaker High is a teen comedy-drama series that ran from 1997 to 1998, airing on YTV in Canada and on UPN's weekday "Kids" block in the United States. The series was created by Cori Stern, while David Winning directed the pilot and seven episodes of the series.

Ownership of the series passed to Disney in 2001 when Disney acquired Fox Kids Worldwide, which also includes Saban Entertainment. The series is not available on Disney+.

Synopsis
The series is set at a high school located on a cruise ship (equivalent to the real Semester at Sea program), allowing the episodes to be set in different exotic locations, although the series was, in fact, filmed entirely in Burnaby, British Columbia. Like most series of its kind, it featured events such as dating, finances, and friendship, although as a daytime series, it tended to steer away from the "tougher" situations (pregnancy, sexuality, etc.) outlined in other primetime teen dramas at the time.

Cast and characters 
The cast consisted primarily of eight high school kids, with a few additional actors portraying adult characters.

Alex Pineda - Played by Kyle Alisharan.
Ashley Dupree - Played by Terri Conn.
Sean Stanley Hanlon - Played by Ryan Gosling.
Cassidy Cartwright - Played by Wendi Kenya.
Jimmy Mortimor Farrell - Played by Tyler Labine.
Max Ballard - Played by Scott Vickaryous.
Denise Williams - Played by Persia White.
Tamira Goldstein - Played by Rachel Wilson.
Ana Mitchell - The kids' teacher. Played by Anne Openshaw.
Captain Ballard - The captain of the ship, school principal and Max's father. Played by Andrew Airlie.
Tony Gifford - The student activities counselor. Played by Richard Ian Cox.
Nigel Mumford - The cook. Played by Bernard Cuffling.
Moe InDaHouse - The Child Moe. Played by Brandon Heuser.

Episode list
 "Sun Ahso Rises"
 "Pranks for the Memories"
 "Mayhem on the Orient Distress"
 "Don't Get Curried Away"
 "Kenya Dig It?"
 "Tomb with a View"
 "Radio Daze"
 "Beware of Geeks Baring Their Gifts"
 "Belly of the Beast"
 "Rooming Violations"
 "Chateau L'Feet J'mae"
 "Out with the Old, In with the Shrew"
 "Tamira is Another Day"
 "For Pizza's Sake"
 "Kissin' Cousins"
 "The Caber Guy"
 "When In Rome..."
 "Silence of the Lamborghini"
 "All Seeing Bull's Eye"
 "Squall's Well that Ends Well"
 "That Lip-Synching Feeling"
 "Yoo Hoo, Mr. Palace Lifeguard"
 "Two Seans Don't Make a Right"
 "Tamira Has Two Faces"
 "Swiss You Were Here"
 "A Funny Thing Happened on the Way to the Post Office"
 "Some You Win, Some You Luge"
 "Stowing Pains"
 "Moon Over Tamira"
 "He Shoots, He Scores"
 "Jimmy Behaving Badly"
 "Regret Me Nots"
 "New Kids on the Deck"
 "Six Degrees of Humiliation" (Part 1)
 "Don't Go Breakin' My Art" (Part 2)
 "Worth Their Waste in Gold"
 "The Deck's Files"
 "Rasta La Vista"
 "Max-He-Can Hat Dance"
 "Kiss of the Shy-er Woman"
 "Lord of the Butterflies"
 "Chile Dog"
 "Heartbreaker High"
 "To Kill a Mocking Nerd"

Syndication
The series currently airs on MTV and MTV2 in Canada.

References

External links

1997 American television series debuts
1998 American television series endings
1990s American comedy-drama television series
1990s American high school television series
1990s American teen drama television series
1997 Canadian television series debuts
1998 Canadian television series endings
1990s Canadian comedy-drama television series
1990s Canadian high school television series
1990s Canadian teen drama television series
English-language television shows
Fictional ships
Nautical television series
YTV (Canadian TV channel) original programming
UPN original programming
UPN Kids
Television series about teenagers
Television shows filmed in Burnaby
Television series by Saban Entertainment